The 2006 Radivoj Korać Cup was the fourth season of the Serbian-Montenegrin men's national basketball cup tournament. The Žućko's Left Trophy awarded to the winner Crvena zvezda from Belgrade.

It was the last time that the Cup was organized in Serbia and Montenegro.

Venue

Qualified teams

Bracket

Qualifications

Quarterfinals

Semifinals

Final

References

External links 
 History of Radivoj Korać Cup

Radivoj Korać Cup (Serbia and Montenegro)
Radivoj
Serbia
Basketball in Belgrade